Dear Old London is a 1933 Australian short film directed by Claude Flemming for Efftee Studios. It is a travelogue of London.

External links
Dear Old London at National Film and Sound Archive

1933 films
Australian drama short films
1933 drama films
Australian black-and-white films
Films directed by Claude Flemming